Alfred B. Williams (February 14, 1948 – July 2, 2007) was an American professional basketball player.

A 6'6" forward from Peoria, Illinois, Williams played at Drake University from 1967 to 1970. He was a member of Drake's 1969 NCAA Final Four team, who lost to UCLA in the national semifinals. Williams graduated as his school's all-time best rebounder with a career average of 8.6 rebounds per game.

From 1970 to 1971, Williams played professional basketball with the Kentucky Colonels of the American Basketball Association. He averaged 3.9 points and 2.4 rebounds in 11 games.

Williams died of liver cancer at a hospital in Georgia.

External links
Obituary
ABA statistics

1948 births
2007 deaths
American men's basketball players
Basketball players from Illinois
Deaths from cancer in Georgia (U.S. state)
Deaths from liver cancer
Drake Bulldogs men's basketball players
Forwards (basketball)
Kentucky Colonels players
New York Knicks draft picks
Sportspeople from Peoria, Illinois
Wilkes-Barre Barons players